Vlado is a Slavic masculine given name. Notable people with the given name include:

Vlado Babić (born 1960), Serbian politician
Vlado Badžim (born 1964), Slovenian football player and football coach
Vlado Bagat (1915–1944), Croatian and Yugoslav soldier
Vlado Bojović (born 1952), Yugoslav handball player 
Vlado Brinovec (1941–2006), Slovenian swimmer
Vlado Bučkovski (born 1962), Macedonian politician
Vlado Čapljić (born 1962), Bosnian football manager and former player
Vlado Chernozemski (1897 –1934), Bulgarian revolutionary
Vlado Dapčević (1917–2001), Montenegrin and Yugoslav communist and revolutionary
Vlado Dijak (1925–1988), Yugoslav poet and songwriter
Vlado Dimovski (born 1971), Slovenian economist, philosopher, politician, and university professor
Vlado Fumić (born 1956), Yugoslav cyclist
Vlado Georgiev (born 1976), Serbian recording artist
Vlado Glođović (born 1976), Serbian football referee 
Vlado Goreski (born 1958), Macedonian scenographer, graphic artist and designer of theatre posters
Vlado Gorišek (1925–1997), Slovenian civil engineer, constructor, and architect
Vlado Gotovac (1930–2000), Croatian poet and politician
Vlado Ilievski (born 1980), Macedonian basketball player
Vlado Ivanov (born 1993), Bulgarian footballer
Vlado Jagodić (born 1964), Bosnian Serb football manager and former player
Vlado Janevski (born 1960), Macedonian singer
Vlado Janković (born 1990), Greek-Serbian basketball player 
Vlado Jeknić (born 1983), Montenegrin footballer
Vlado Jovanovski (born 1967), Macedonian actor
Vlado Jug (born 1947), Slovenian ice hockey player
Vlado Kalember (born 1953), Croatian pop singer
Vlado Komšić (born 1955), Yugoslav footballer
Vlado Košić (born 1959), Croatian Roman Catholic bishop
Vlado Kotur (born 1958), Bosnian-Herzegovinian footballer and coach
Vlado Kreslin (born 1953), Slovenian singer-songwriter and folk rock musician
Vlado Kristl (1923–2004), Yugoslav filmmaker and artist
Vlado Lemić (born 1966), Serbian former footballer and current football agent
Vlado Lisjak (born 1962), Croatian Greco-Roman wrestler
Vlado Maleski (1919–1984), Yugoslav Macedonian writer, communist activist, publisher and revolutionary
Vlado Marković (born 1985), Bosnian-Herzegovinian footballer
Vlado Martek (born 1951), Croatian artist
Vlado Mažuranić (1915–1985), Yugoslav fencer
Vlado Meller, Czechoslovak-born audio mastering engineer
Vlado Miloševič (born 1968), Slovenian footballer
Vlado Milošević (1901–1990), Serbian composer and ethnomusicologist 
Vlado Milunić (born 1941), Czech architect
Vlado Mirković (born 1975), Montenegrin footballer
Vlado Mirosevic (born 1987), Chilean political scientist and politician
Vlado Mrkic (born 1940), Bosnian-Herzegovinian writer and journalist
Vlado Nedanovski (born 1985), Macedonian handball player
Vlado Paradžik (born 1967), Bosnia and Herzegovina judoka
Vlado Perlemuter (1904–2002), Lithuanian-born French pianist and teacher
Vlado Petković (born 1983), Serbian volleyball player
Vlado Poslek (born 1969), Croatian sprint canoer
Vlado Pravdić (born 1949), Bosnian musician 
Vlado Šćepanović (born 1975), Montenegrin basketball coach and former player
Vlado Šegrt (1907–1991), Yugoslav politician
Vlado Singer (1908–1943), Yugoslav politician
Vlado Sirvoň (born 1951), Slovak volleyball player
Vlado Šmit (born 1980), Serbian footballer
Vlado Smokvina (1908–1982), Yugoslav swimmer
Vlado Šola (born 1968), Croatian handball player
Vlado Stenzel (born 1934), Croatian team handball player 
Vlado Strugar (1922–2019), Serbian historian
Vlado Taneski (1952–2008), Macedonian crime reporter and serial killer
Vlado Tomovic (1996), Serbian-Canadian politician
Vlado Tortevski (born 1959), Macedonian football manager and former player
Vlado Vukoje (born 1952), Croatian handball player and handball coach
Vlado Zadro (born 1987), Bosnian-Herzegovinian football player 
Vlado Zlojutro (born 1988), Swedish footballer

See also
 Vladimir (name)
 Vladislav

Croatian masculine given names
Serbian masculine given names